Vélez is a surname of Spanish origin. Although it has been suggested that it could be derived from Basque, it is, in fact, a patronym from the medieval name Vela, which itself is derived from Vigila (Wigila), a Germanic name used by the Visigoths. In its earliest usage, the surname took the forms of Vigílaz and Vélaz.

Family researchers maintain that the surname was first found in Cantabria, although there are various places scattered throughout the south, especially in Andalusia, called Vélez, including Vélez-Blanco, Vélez-Málaga and Vélez-Rubio.

People 
One of the many Marquis of Los Vélez.

Surname 
 José Luis Rodríguez Vélez (Santiago, 1915 - Panama, 1984), Panamanian composer, musical director, saxophonist, clarinetist and guitarist. 
 Ada Vélez (born 1970), Puerto Rican female boxer
 Álvaro Uribe (born 1952), President of Colombia
 Clemente Soto Vélez (1905–1993), Puerto Rican nationalist, poet, journalist and activist
 David Vélez (businessman), Colombian, CEO and Founder of Nubank
 Desiree Marie Velez, Puerto Rican–American actor
 Eddie Velez (born 1958), American film, stage and television actor
 Eugenio Vélez (born 1982), Dominican Republic baseball player
 Fermín Vélez (1959–2003), Spanish racecar driver
 Glen Velez, American musician
 Higinio Vélez (c. 1947 – 2021), Cuban baseball manager
 Humberto Vélez, Mexican voice actor
 Ion Vélez (born 1985), Spanish/Basque footballer
 Jane Velez-Mitchell, American news journalist
 José A. Vélez Jr. (born 1963), Puerto Rican jockey
 Juan Vélez (born 1983), Puerto Rican singer, musician and songwriter
 Julián Estiven Vélez (born 1982), Colombian footballer
 Lauren Vélez (born 1964), American actress, twin sister of Loraine Vélez
 Lilian Velez (1924–1948), Filipino film actress and singer
 Loraine Vélez (born 1964), American actress, twin sister of Lauren Vélez
 Lupe Vélez (1908–1944), Mexican–American actress
 Marco Vélez, Puerto Rican soccer player
 Otto Vélez, Puerto Rican baseball player
 Pedro Vélez (1787–1848), Mexican politician and lawyer
 Simón Vélez (born 1949), Colombian architect
 Wilkins Vélez (born 1953), Puerto Rican pop music singer and composer

First surname
 Silvestre Vélez de Escalante, Franciscan missionary
 Íñigo Vélez de Guevara, 7th Count of Oñate (1566–1644)
 Íñigo Vélez de Guevara, 8th Count of Oñate (1597–1658)
 Íñigo Vélez de Guevara, 10th Count of Oñate (1642–1699)
 Luís Vélez de Guevara (1579–1644), Spanish dramatist and novelist
 Dalmacio Vélez Sársfield (1801–1875), Argentine lawyer and politician

Fictional 
 Jaime Velez (Oz), Latino inmate on the HBO drama Oz
 Valeria Velez, fictional mistress of Pablo Escobar in the Netflix series Narcos. Based on the Colombian journalist Virginia Vallejo.

See also
Velez (disambiguation)
Veles (disambiguation)

References 

Surnames
Surnames of Spanish origin